Uroš Lučić (born March 12, 1983) is a Serbian professional basketball player who last played for Radnički Beograd of the Second Basketball League of Serbia.

He is the older brother of Vladimir Lučić, who is currently playing for Bayern Munich.

Professional career
During his career, Lučić played for numerous clubs in several countries, most notably with Zlatorog Laško and Krka in Slovenia. In his homeland, Lučić played with OKK Beograd and Radnički Kragujevac.

References

External links
 Uroš Lučić at aba-liga.com
 Uroš Lučić at eurocupbasketball.com
 Uroš Lučić at fiba.com

1983 births
Living people
ABA League players
Basketball players from Belgrade
Basketball League of Serbia players
BKK Radnički players
CSM Oradea (basketball) players
Jászberényi KSE players
KK Ergonom players
KK Krka players
KK MZT Skopje players
KK Radnički KG 06 players
KK Radnički Kragujevac (2009–2014) players
KK Sloga players
KK Vizura players
KK Zdravlje players
KK Zlatorog Laško players
OKK Beograd players
Power forwards (basketball)
Serbian expatriate basketball people in Hungary
Serbian expatriate basketball people in North Macedonia
Serbian expatriate basketball people in Romania
Serbian expatriate basketball people in Slovenia
Serbian men's basketball players